Achroonema is a genus of bacteria with uncertain systematics.

The genus was described in 1948 by Heinrich Leonhards Skuja.

Species:
 Achroonema angustatum (Koppe) Skuja
 Achroonema articulatum Skuja
 Achroonema gotlandicum Skuja
 Achroonema inaequale Skuja
 Achroonema lentum Skuja
 Achroonema macromeres Skuja
 Achroonema proteiforme Skuja
 Achroonema simplex Skuja
 Achroonema spiroideum Skuja
 Achroonema splendens Skuja
 Achroonema sporogenum Skuja
 Achroonema subsalsum Behre

References

Bacteria genera